Alouette Lake, originally Lillooet Lake and not to be confused with the lake of that name farther north, is a lake and reservoir in Maple Ridge, British Columbia, Canada. It is located at the southeast foot of the mountain group known as the Golden Ears and is about 16 km in length on a northeast–southwest axis.  It and the Alouette River, formerly the Lillooet River, were renamed in 1914 to avoid confusion with the larger river and lake farther north, with "Alouette", the French word for "lark", being chosen as being melodious and reminiscent of the original name in tone.

Most of the basin of Alouette Lake has never been logged and its north flank is protected as part of Golden Ears Provincial Park (formerly part of Garibaldi Provincial Park until that park's division). A small portion of the lake and its largely inaccessible northwestern shore, near its narrows, are actually part of the District of Mission due to the rectangular shape of that district's boundary.  North of the portion of the lake that is in Mission, the rest of its northern end is not in either municipality.

Alouette Dam
At the end of the tunnel is a penstock which feeds the small Alouette Powerhouse, an 8 MW power station operated by BC Hydro, which lies midway along the west shore of Stave Lake. There is no powerhouse at the dam, however, as the point of the reservoir is to feed the tunnel through the flank of the ridge between Mounts Crickmer and Robie Reid. A former railway grade leading to the dam along the river was also used as a logging railway.

Facilities
A large public beach, picnic site and campground that are part of the provincial park are located on the lake's western shore.

References

External links

Lakes of the Lower Mainland
Maple Ridge, British Columbia
Mission, British Columbia
Reservoirs in British Columbia
New Westminster Land District